Panagiotis Stroubakos (born 8 September 1972 in Athens) is a retired Greek middle distance runner who specialized in the 800 metres.

He competed at the Olympic Games in 2000 and 2004, the World Championships in 1997 and 1999 and the 2002 European Championships without reaching the final.

His personal best time is 1:45.00 minutes, achieved in August 1997 in Zürich. This is the Greek record.

Honours

References 

1972 births
Living people
Greek male middle-distance runners
Athletes (track and field) at the 2000 Summer Olympics
Athletes (track and field) at the 2004 Summer Olympics
Olympic athletes of Greece
Panathinaikos Athletics
Athletes from Athens
World Athletics Championships athletes for Greece
Athletes (track and field) at the 2001 Mediterranean Games
Mediterranean Games competitors for Greece